A bluecoat school is a type of charity school in England, the first of which was founded in the 16th century. Most of them have closed; some remain open as schools, often on different sites, and some of the original buildings have been adapted for other purposes. They are known as "bluecoat schools" because of the distinctive blue uniform originally worn by their pupils. The colour blue was traditionally the colour of charity and was a common colour for clothing at the time. The uniform included a blue frock coat and yellow stockings with white bands.

History
The first school to be established was Christ's Hospital.  This was founded by Edward VI in Newgate Street, London, in 1552, as a foundling hospital with the purpose of caring for and educating poor children.  Between the 16th and late 18th centuries about 60 similar institutions were established in different parts of England.  These were not connected with Christ's Hospital, but if their pupils wore the blue uniform, they were known as bluecoat schools.  The original Christ's Hospital, while retaining its name, has moved its site to West Sussex and developed into an independent school, with much of its costs being met by a charitable foundation.

Schools

See also
Bluecoat, type of school uniform
Bluecoat (disambiguation)

References

Christ's Hospital
 Bluecoat school